Hekou Town is an urban town in Xiangtan County, Hunan Province, People's Republic of China.  it had a population of 45,000 and an area of .

Administrative division
The town is divided into 35 villages and 1 community, the following areas: Xinjie Community, Hekou Village, Yuexing Village, Qili Village, Xianjin Village, Fengshuchong Village, Shuangbanqiao Village, Baimi Village, Zhongwan Village, Taihe Village, Sanlian Village, Shanhu Village, Tianbai Village, Gaosi Village, Shaquan Village, Yangji Village, Zitang Village, Liantuo Village, Shuangjiangkou Village, Luhua Village, Youyu Village, Taolun Village, Hongqi Village, Shangxingqiao Village, Tongjiaba Village, Daba Village, Linquan Village, Yijia Village, Jingzhushan Village, Xilin Village, Xinxin Village, Qingshichong Village, Dongquan Village, Gutangqiao Village, Fengshu Village, and Shiwan Village.

History
In 1984, Hekou Township was built. In 1993, Heku Town was built.

Geography
Xiang River, Yisu River and Lian River flow through the town.

Economy
Rice, water melon and rapeseed are important to the economy.

Culture
Huaguxi is the most influence local theater.

Transportation
The major highways is the 320 National Road.

References

External links

Divisions of Xiangtan County